The 1956 Newport by-election was a parliamentary by-election held on 6 July 1956 for the British House of Commons constituency of Newport in Monmouthshire.

The seat had become vacant when the constituency's Labour Member of Parliament (MP), Peter Freeman had died on 19 May 1956, aged 67.  He had held the seat since the 1945 general election, having previously been MP for Brecon and Radnorshire from 1929 to 1931.

Candidates
The Labour candidate was Sir Frank Soskice, who had been Solicitor General and then Attorney General in the Labour Government 1945-1951. His Sheffield Neepsend constituency had been abolished for the 1955 general election.

The Conservative Party selected as its candidate Donald Box, a stockbroker from Cardiff who had contested the seat at the 1955 general election.  The Liberal Party did not field a candidate, and third candidate was Emrys Roberts of Plaid Cymru.

Results
Soskice held the seat with a majority higher than that achieved by Freeman the previous year. He held the seat until he retired from the House of Commons at the 1966 general election, having been Home Secretary from 1964 to 1965.

Box was elected at the 1959 general election in Cardiff North, and held that seat until 1966.

Votes

See also
 Newport constituency
 1922 Newport by-election
 1945 Newport by-election
 Newport
 Lists of United Kingdom by-elections
 United Kingdom by-election records

References

 "The Times House of Commons Supplement" Issued June 1957.
 British parliamentary by-elections: 1956
 

Newport by-election
Newport by-election
Newport by-election, 1956
Newport by-election
By-elections to the Parliament of the United Kingdom in Welsh constituencies
History of Newport, Wales
Politics of Newport, Wales
20th century in Monmouthshire
Elections in Monmouthshire